Ivan Dodig (born 2 January 1985) is a Croatian professional tennis player who primarily specialises in doubles.

He is a six-time Grand Slam champion, having won men's doubles titles at the 2015 French Open with Marcelo Melo, and the 2021 Australian Open with Filip Polášek. In mixed doubles, Dodig won the 2018 and 2019 French Opens and 2019 Wimbledon Championships, all alongside Latisha Chan, and the 2022 Australian Open partnering Kristina Mladenovic. He also finished runner-up at the 2013 Wimbledon Championships in men's doubles, and the 2016 French Open and 2017 Australian Open in mixed. Dodig has won 20 doubles titles on the ATP Tour, including five at Masters 1000 level, and also finished runner-up at the 2014 ATP World Tour Finals. He reached his career-high doubles ranking of world No. 4 in June 2015.

In singles, Dodig achieved his highest ranking of world No. 29 in October 2013, and won his first ATP title at the 2011 Zagreb Indoors. His best Grand Slam singes result was at the 2013 Wimbledon Championships, where he reached the fourth round. Dodig has represented Croatia in the Davis Cup since 2010, and was part of the team which won the tournament in 2018. He also won a silver medal in men's doubles at the 2020 Summer Olympics alongside Marin Čilić.

Career

2010
At the 2010 Australian Open, he qualified for the main draw and beat former world No. 1, Juan Carlos Ferrero, in the first round in five sets. However, he bowed out to Stefan Koubek in the second round.

Dodig then spent most of the rest of the year competing on the Challenger tour. He failed to qualify for the 2010 French Open, but reached the second round at Wimbledon, beating Óscar Hernández before losing to Sam Querrey in four sets. He also reached the second round at the 2010 US Open, after beating Fernando González, who retired with a knee injury, but Dodig himself retired with an injury against Thiemo de Bakker.

2011
At the 2011 Australian Open, Dodig played Ivo Karlović in the first round and prevailed in a tough five set match. He was then drawn to play third seed and eventual champion Novak Djokovic in the second round. Although he lost in four sets, he was the only player to win a set against Djokovic in the whole tournament.

He followed this up with a surprise first tournament win in front of his home crowd at the 2011 PBZ Zagreb Indoors, beating the previous year's finalist Michael Berrer.

He then made a second-round appearance at the 2011 Regions Morgan Keegan Championships, losing to the comeback kid Juan Martín del Potro. Dodig then reached the quarterfinals at the 2011 Delray Beach International Tennis Championships after beating Kunitsyn and Sela, before losing to Janko Tipsarević.

First-round action in the Davis Cup, a showdown between Croatia and Germany, saw Dodig up against Kohlschreiber, but he succumbed to the German in five sets. The loss proved costly, as Germany went on to prevail 3–2 in the tie to move on to the quarterfinals.

At the 2011 Sony Ericsson Open he beat Andrey Golubev in the first round. However, he lost to world No. 4 Robin Söderling despite being up 4–2 in the third set.

At the 2011 Monte-Carlo Rolex Masters, he bowed out to World No.29 Tommy Robredo in the first round.

Dodig then found some good form heading into the 2011 Barcelona Open Banco Sabadell tournament. In the opening round he beat Vincent Millot before beating No.3 seed and last year's finalist Robin Söderling. He then went on to claim hard fought scalps over fast-rising Canadian Milos Raonic and home favourite Feliciano López to reach the semifinals of a clay-court tournament for the first time in his career. However, in the semifinals, he was inevitably stopped by five-time champion and eventual champion for the sixth time, world No. 1 Rafael Nadal who is still yet to lose a match on Barcelona soil. Despite breaking twice as he broke once in each set to hang on with Nadal, Dodig eventually fell after giving a decent fight, which added to the Spaniard's current winning streak on clay.

In the second round of the Rogers Cup, Dodig stunned world No. 2 Rafael Nadal, 1–6, 7–6, 7–6 after recovering from a 1–6, 1–3 deficit before losing to Janko Tipsarević in the third round.

On 30 August 2011, in the US Open first round Dodig lost to Nikolay Davydenko in a closely fought five sets match.

2012
At the first gram slam of the year, the 2012 Australian Open he retired against Frederico Gil. At the next two slams he also lost in the first round to Robin Haase and Lukáš Rosol at the 2012 French Open and Wimbledon respectively. At the 2012 Summer Olympics he lost to Juan Martín del Potro in the first round of the men's singles. He fared better in the men's doubles, where he and partner Marin Čilić reached the quarter-finals. At the 2012 US Open he beat qualifier Hiroki Moriya in the first round, however lost his second round match against Andy Murray in straight sets.

2013: Top 30 and career-high ranking in singles, Wimbledon doubles finalist
Dodig had his most successful season to date, reaching the third round or better at three out of four major tournaments, and breaking into the world's top 30 for the first time. At the Australian Open, Dodig reached the third round of a Grand Slam for the first time, beating Di Wu and Jarkko Nieminen respectively in the first two rounds, before losing to number 10 seed Richard Gasquet. He reached his first quarterfinal of the year at the PBZ Zagreb Indoors, losing to 3rd seed Mikhail Youzhny. At Indian Wells, Dodig defeated 28th seed Julien Benneteau en route to the third round before falling to world No. 2, Roger Federer in straight sets.

During the clay-court season, Dodig reached the semifinals of the BMW Open before falling to eventual champion Tommy Haas. However at the French Open, Dodig lost an extremely tight first round match to Guido Pella, losing 12 games to 10 in the fifth set. He then went on to have his best run at a Grand Slam event to date, due in part to some luck and a brace of injuries, reaching the fourth round at Wimbledon despite only completing one match. Philipp Kohlschreiber retired in the first round in the fifth set. He then beat Denis Kudla in straight sets, followed by Igor Sijsling retiring in the third set. In the fourth round, he led David Ferrer by a set, but eventually lost in four. He and his partner Marcelo Melo also finished as runners-up in the men's doubles to Bob and Mike Bryan.

2014: ATP World Tour Finals runner-up and two Masters Finals 
He was the 32nd seed at the 2014 Australian Open where he reached the second round before retiring to Damir Džumhur.

At the 2014 Barcelona Open, Dodig beat world No. 30 Feliciano López in second round and lost to Rafael Nadal in round of 16. At the Rome Masters, he defeated Federico Delbonis and Lukas Rosol, then was beaten in third round by Jérémy Chardy in round of 16. 

At the Canada Masters, the Croatian took wins over world No. 14 John Isner and Andreas Seppi, after which he was defeated by fifth seeded David Ferrer.

2015–2017: 2015 French open doubles title and World No. 4, 2017 top 5 year-end doubles ranking
Dodig had a strong showing in the men's doubles event at the 2015 Australian Open. Dodig and his partner Marcelo Melo reached the semifinals after falling to Pierre-Hugues Herbert and Nicolas Mahut.

During the clay court season, Dodig and Melo won their first title of the year at the Mexican Open after winning over Mariusz Fyrstenberg and Santiago González 7–6(7–2), 5–7, 10–3. At the 2015 French Open, Dodig and Melo won their maiden Grand Slam title beating Bob Bryan and Mike Bryan 6–7(5–7), 7–6(7–5), 7–5. This win helped Dodig to reach his career high ranking of world No.4 in doubles on 8 June 2015.

Following the grass court season, Dodig and Melo lost in the quarterfinals of the 2015 Wimbledon Championships to qualifiers Jonathan Erlich and Philipp Petzschner 6–4, 2–6, 2–6, 4–6.

Dodig and Melo were knocked out in the third round of the 2016 Wimbledon Championships Doubles, whilst Dodig was knocked out in the first round of the singles. Dodig and Melo won the masters 1000 tournaments at the 2016 Rogers Cup and the 2016 Western & Southern Open. The pair were runners up at the 2016 Nottingham Open as top seeds.

2019–2021: New partnerships, Australian Open champion, back to top 10, Olympics silver medalist
Dodig won the 2019 Western & Southern Open, the 2019 China Open and the 2021 Australian Open with his new partner Filip Polášek. As a result he returned to the top 10 on 22 February 2021. They also reached the 2019 Rolex Paris Masters, the 2020 Australian Open and the 2021 Miami Open semifinals.

At the 2020 Olympics, Dodig partnered Marin Čilić and won a silver medal, losing to fellow Croats and top seeds Nikola Mektić and Mate Pavić in 3 sets 4–6, 6–3, [6–10]. It was the third time in the Olympics men's doubles' history that the same country won both gold and silver, and the first one since 1908.

For the North-American hard court swing, Dodig partnered with Rohan Bopanna with their best showing being the quarterfinals of the 2021 Canadian Open where they were defeated by the eventual champions Salisbury/Ram. 

He reached the final at the 2021 Winston-Salem Open with new partner Austin Krajicek.

At the 2021 BNP Paribas Open in Indian Wells, he reached his second Masters 1000 semifinal for 2021 after reuniting with Marcelo Melo where they were defeated by the eventual champions, his former partner Polasek and John Peers. Seeded as a top pair, Dodig and Melo reached the quarterfinals at the 2021 European Open.

2022: Australian Open mixed doubles title, French Open runner-up, 20th title 
Dodig partnering Kristina Mladenovic won the mixed doubles event at the 2022 Australian Open. It was his second title at this Major and sixth Grand Slam title overall.

Partnering with Austin Krajicek they won their first title as a pair at the 2022 ATP Lyon Open, having reached the final at the 2021 Winston-Salem Open previously together.

At the 2022 French Open he reached his fourth Grand Slam doubles final in his career also partnering with Krajicek defeating en route World No. 1 and No. 2 and top seeds Joe Salisbury and Rajeev Ram and saving five match points in the quarterfinals. They lost to Marcelo Arevalo and Jean Julien Rojer in the final.

At the 2022 Halle Open and the 2022 Eastbourne International he reached the semifinals with Krajicek.

At the ATP 500 2022 Citi Open, he reached his 40th doubles career final. Then, he reached his 41th at the 2022 Firenze Open defeating Nicolas Mahut and Édouard Roger-Vasselin. At the 2022 Tennis Napoli Cup he won his second title with Krajicek as a team defeating home favorites Lorenzo Sonego / Andrea Vavassori to reach their fifth final of 2022 and Australian duo Matthew Ebden/John Peers in the final.
He reached his third straight and sixth final for the season with Krajicek at the ATP 500 2022 Swiss Indoors in Basel defeating top seeds Arevalo/Rojer and the Kazakhstani duo of Andrey Golubev and Aleksandr Nedovyesov en route. The team won their third title together defeating Mahut/Roger-Vasselin. 

At the 2022 Rolex Paris Masters the pair Dodig/Krajicek reached the semifinals defeating Belgian pair Sander Gille/Joran Vliegen and top seeds Rajeev Ram/Joe Salisbury to reach their seventh final of the season climbing to World No. 9 and World No. 10 respectively. On 5 November, the pair qualified for the 2022 ATP Finals after defeating German duo Kevin Krawietz and Andreas Mies to reach their seventh final of 2022 as a team and eight for Dodig. Dodig reached world No. 8 in the rankings on 7 November 2022.

Personal life
On 16 November 2013, Dodig married Maja Ćubela. On 16 June 2014, his wife gave birth to their son, Petar.

Significant finals

Grand Slam finals

Doubles: 4 (2 titles, 2 runners-up)

Mixed doubles: 6 (4 titles, 2 runner-ups)

Olympic finals

Doubles: 1 (1 silver medal)

Year-end championships

Doubles: 1 (1 runner-up)

Masters 1000 finals

Doubles: 11 (5 titles, 6 runner-ups)

ATP career finals

Singles: 2 (1 title, 1 runner-up)

Doubles: 45 (20 titles, 25 runner-ups)

Team competition finals

Davis Cup: 2 (1 title, 1 runner-up)

Performance timelines

Singles

Doubles
Current through the 2022 Qatar ExxonMobil Open.

Mixed doubles 

 At the 2018 US Open, Dodig and Chan withdrew before their second round match, this is not counted as a loss.

Top 10 wins
Dodig has a  record against players who were, at the time the match was played, ranked in the top 10.

References

External links

 Official website 
 
 
 
 
 

1985 births
Living people
Bosnia and Herzegovina male tennis players
Croatian expatriate sportspeople in Germany
Croatian male tennis players
Croats of Bosnia and Herzegovina
People from Čitluk, Bosnia and Herzegovina
Tennis players at the 2012 Summer Olympics
Tennis players at the 2020 Summer Olympics
Olympic tennis players of Croatia
French Open champions
Grand Slam (tennis) champions in men's doubles
Wimbledon champions
Grand Slam (tennis) champions in mixed doubles
Medalists at the 2020 Summer Olympics
Olympic silver medalists for Croatia
Olympic medalists in tennis